James Henry Townley (16 February 1905 – 21 March 1991) was an  Australian rules footballer who played with Hawthorn in the Victorian Football League (VFL).

Notes

External links 

1905 births
1991 deaths
Australian rules footballers from Victoria (Australia)
Hawthorn Football Club players